Cameron Murray (born 16 January 1998) is an Australian professional rugby league footballer who plays as a  and  forward. He is the current captain of the South Sydney Rabbitohs in the NRL. 

He has also represented New South Wales and Australia at international level.

Early life
Murray was born in Sydney, New South Wales, Australia.

Murray played his junior rugby league for the Mascot Jets, before being signed by the South Sydney Rabbitohs. He attended Newington College, completing his HSC in 2015. Academically, Murray performed well, achieving 1st place in the college in Earth and Environment Science, with a Band 6 (raw mark of 91). He was captain of Newington's GPS Championship Winning 1st XV Rugby team that same year. In his final year at the college he turned down captaincy of the Under-18 NSW State of Origin side in favour of playing for his school.

Cameron's father, Corey Murray, made 12 appearances for the Rabbitohs in the early 1990s.

Playing career

2016
In October 2015, Murray re-signed with the Rabbitohs on a 4-year contract until the end of 2019. Late in 2015, he played for the Australian Schoolboys. In 2016, he played for the South Sydney Rabbitohs' NYC team. He also featured for the Rabbitohs' Intrust Super Premiership NSW team, North Sydney Bears in 2016, playing a total of 6 games and scoring 1 try.

On June 22, Murray captained the NSW Blues Under-18 side as they defeated Queensland 26-0 at Suncorp Stadium.

2017
Murray started off 2017 by playing in the Intrust Super Premiership NSW for North Sydney. 

In May, he was selected to start at lock for the Junior Kangaroos team to play the Junior Kiwis.

In round 8 of the 2017 NRL season, he made his NRL debut for the Rabbitohs off the bench against the Brisbane Broncos in round 8. Murray was named captain of the NSW Blues U20 side in May and playing in the 2nd row, as NSW defeated Queensland 30-16.

Murray went on to play 9 NRL matches in 2017, scoring his maiden try in round 24 against the New Zealand Warriors. He was named the club's rookie of the year at season's end.

2018
Murray was key part of the Rabbitohs side which finished 3rd in 2018, often starting the game on the bench. In week one of the finals against the Melbourne Storm, Murray scored what seemed to be the game winning try, before a late try and field goal to the Storm handed Souths a 29–28 loss.

In week 2 of the finals against the St. George-Illawarra Dragons, Murray stripped the ball from Leeson Ah Mau with the Rabbitohs trailing by a point with just over three minutes remaining. Adam Reynolds then kicked two field goals as the Rabbitohs won 13-12. The Rabbitohs were knocked out in the preliminary final, losing 12-4 to the Sydney Roosters.

Despite coming off the bench for majority of the season, Murray was regarded as one of the Rabbitohs best performers and was lauded for his quick play-the-ball speed setting up attacking opportunities for his teammates.

2019
In 2019, Murray was named as starting lock, with new coach Wayne Bennett moving captain Sam Burgess to the 2nd row to accommodate for Murray. He started off 2019 in strong form as Souths won 10 of their first 11 games. Murray earned his first representative honour as he was selected to play for the New South Wales Blues by coach Brad Fittler. He played in all 3 matches for NSW in the 2019 State of Origin series as the Blues won the series 2–1.

At the end of the 2019 regular season, Souths finished third on the table and qualified for the finals. In the elimination final against the Manly-Warringah Sea Eagles, Murray scored two crucial tries as Souths won the game 32–26 at ANZ Stadium. Murray featured in the club's preliminary final match against the Canberra Raiders the following week which Souths lost 16–10 at Canberra Stadium.

On 2 October, Murray was named as the 2019 Dally M lock of the year at the Dally M Awards ceremony. In addition, Murray received the Rabbitohs Jack Rayner's Players' Player award as judged by his teammates.

On 7 October, Murray was named in the Australian side for the Oceania Cup fixtures and made his Test debut on 2 November against Tonga, who won 16-12 to defeat Australia for the first time.

2020 
In the 2020 NRL season, Murray was moved by Bennett to the starting 2nd row position to replace John Sutton and Burgess, who both retired before the season began. Murray often played the opening minutes of the match on the edge before shifting back to his traditional lock spot, in an attempt to increase his output by reducing his workload in the opening exchanges of the match. This move was short-lived however, with Murray reverting to the number 13 jersey by round 5.

Murray played 23 games for Souths in 2020 as the club reached their third straight preliminary final but fell short of a grand final appearance once again, losing 20-16 to the Penrith Panthers.

Murray was selected for NSW for the 2020 State of Origin series commencing in November, however he suffered a hamstring injury after playing just four minutes of the opening game in Adelaide and was then ruled out for the remainder of the series.

2021
In the round 8 match against the Raiders, Murray suffered a grade two syndesmosis injury and was ruled out for four weeks. Despite this, he was selected for game one of the 2021 State of Origin series. Murray played all three matches for NSW, starting in the second row, as the Blues claimed a 2–1 series win.

Murray played a total of 20 games for South Sydney in 2021, including the club's grand final defeat against the Panthers.
On 18 December 2021, Murray was named captain of the South Sydney club by new coach Jason Demetriou after the departure of Adam Reynolds to Brisbane.

2022
On 29 May, Murray was selected by New South Wales to play in game one of the 2022 State of Origin series.  Murray played in all three games as New South Wales lost the series 2-1.

Murray played 23 games for South Sydney in the 2022 NRL season including all three of the clubs finals matches as they reached the preliminary final for a fifth straight season.  Souths would lose in the preliminary final to eventual premiers Penrith 32-12.

In October he was named in the Australia squad for the 2021 Rugby League World Cup. Murray played for Australia in their 2021 Rugby League World Cup final victory over Samoa, scoring a try during Australia's 30-10 victory.

In November he was named in the 2021 RLWC Team of the Tournament.

References

External links

South Sydney Rabbitohs profile
Rabbitohs profile
NRL profile

1998 births
Living people
Australia national rugby league team players
Australian rugby league players
New South Wales Rugby League State of Origin players
North Sydney Bears NSW Cup players
People educated at Newington College
South Sydney Rabbitohs captains
South Sydney Rabbitohs players
Rugby league locks
Rugby league players from Sydney